Muhammad Haroon (born 8 January 1968) is a former Pakistani cricketer who is the current coach of the Norwegian national side. A right-handed leg spinner and competent middle-to-lower-order batsman, his playing career included first-class matches for Lahore Division (from 1999 to 2000) and for Sheikhupura (from 2000 to 2002). Holding a level-4 ECB coaching qualification, Haroon was appointed coach of Norway in early 2014, and has since coached the team at several international tournaments.

Playing career
Born in Sheikhupura, Haroon played for Lahore Division at the 1986–87 National Under-19 Championship, and made his grade-II Quaid-e-Azam Trophy debut during the 1990–91 season, for the same team. One of his most notable performances in that competition, which did not have first-class status, came in December 1995, when he took 8/138 and 5/153 in the final against the Karachi Greens (match figures of 13/291). During the 1998–99 season, Lahore Division won the grade-II Quaid-e-Azam final against Multan, winning through to the main division. Haroon consequently made his first-class debut during the 1999–00 season, scoring a half century, 51 runs, against Bahawalpur in his first match. He finished the season having played in only five of a possible nine matches, but scored 519 runs at a batting average of 86.50, the sixth-highest average in the competition. This included two centuries – 107 against Hyderabad, and then a career-high 130 against WPDA.

Haroon also made his limited-overs debut during the 1999–00 season, playing two Tissot Cup matches and four National Bank Cup matches for Lahore Division. The following season, however, he switched to playing for the new Sheikhupura team, which was largely a direct replacement for the disbanded Lahore Division. In that season's one-day tournament, he scored a maiden half-century, 64 not out against Gujranwala, and in the same match also took what was to be his best bowling figures, 4/35 from seven overs. In the other one-day matches, Haroon was less successful, and in the Quaid-e-Azam Trophy, he failed to score a single half-century from his five matches, as well as taking only three wickets. During the 2001–02 season, he played only once for Sheikhupura, against Rawalpindi in the Quaid-e-Azam, which was his final high-level competitive match. Haroon had spent the 2001 English season playing club cricket for Market Deeping in the Lincolnshire Premier League, and remained with the club through to the end of the 2006 season. After that, from 2007 to 2011, he switched to Nassington, a club in the Cambridgeshire and Huntingdonshire League.

After 2011 Haroon joined Ramsey Cricket Club and was a massive influence with both coaching and playing until his departure to coach Norway in 2014.

Haroon played for Falken Cricket klubb Norwegian League in season 2015/16 as an allrounder.

Coaching career
While still playing club cricket, Haroon began to train as a coach, eventually becoming the first person from the Subcontinent to gain a level-4 qualification from the England and Wales Cricket Board (ECB). In early 2014, he was appointed head coach of Norway for an initial four-month term, which included the 2014 ICC European T20 Championship Division Two tournament. Haroon had his contract extended after the team won that tournament, and has since coached the team at the 2015 European Division One and the 2015 World Cricket League Division Six tournaments. He has also been involved in coaching the national under-19 side, organising a tour of Lincolnshire during the 2014 season using the connections from his playing career.

References

External links
Player profile and statistics at Cricket Archive
Player profile and statistics at ESPNcricinfo

1968 births
Living people
Cricket in Norway
Lahore Division cricketers
Pakistani cricket coaches
Pakistani cricketers
Pakistani expatriate sportspeople in Norway
Pakistani expatriates in the United Kingdom
Cricketers from Sheikhupura
Sheikhupura cricketers